The Tigers entered the season as the reigning World Series champions. The 1985 Detroit Tigers finished in third place in the American League Eastern Division with a record of 84-77 (.522), 15 games behind the Blue Jays.  The Tigers outscored their opponents 729 to 688.  The Tigers drew 2,286,609 fans to Tiger Stadium in 1983, ranking 3rd of the 14 teams in the American League.

Regular season

Season standings

Record vs. opponents

Notable transactions
 April 5, 1985: Roger Mason was traded by the Detroit Tigers to the San Francisco Giants for Alejandro Sánchez.
 June 3, 1985: 1985 Major League Baseball draft
Scott Lusader was drafted by the Tigers in the 6th round.
Mark Lee was drafted by the Tigers in the 15th round.
Andy Stankiewicz was drafted by the Tigers in the 18th round, but did not sign.
John Smoltz was drafted by the Tigers in the 22nd round. Player signed September 22, 1985.

Roster

Player stats

Batting

Starters by position
Note: Pos = Position; G = Games played; AB = At bats; H = Hits; Avg. = Batting average; HR = Home runs; RBI = Runs Batted In

Other batters
Note: G = Games played; AB = At bats; H = Hits; Avg. = Batting average; HR = Home runs; RBI = Runs Batted In

Pitching

Starting pitchers
Note: G = Games; IP = Innings pitched; W = Wins; L = Losses; ERA = Earned run average; SO = Strikeouts

Other pitchers
Note: G = Games pitched; IP = Innings pitched; W = Wins; L = Losses; ERA = Earned run average; SO = Strikeouts

Relief pitchers
Note: G = Games pitched; W= Wins; L= Losses; SV = Saves; GF = Games Finished; ERA = Earned run average; SO = Strikeouts

Players ranking among top 100 all time at position
The following members of the 1985 Detroit Tigers are among the Top 100 of all time at their position, as ranked by The Bill James Historical Baseball Abstract:
 Lance Parrish: 19th best catcher of all time
 Lou Whitaker: 13th best second baseman of all time
 Darrell Evans: 10th best third baseman of all time
 Alan Trammell: 9th best shortstop of all time
 Kirk Gibson: 36th best left fielder of all time
 Chet Lemon: 48th best center fielder of all time

Award winners and league leaders

Tom Brookens
 AL leader in errors by a third baseman (23)
 #9 in AL in doubles (34)

Darrell Evans
 Tiger of the Year Award, by Detroit baseball writers
 MLB leader in home runs (40)
 MLB leader in at bats per home run (12.6)
 Finished 14th in AL MVP voting
 #4 in AL in intentional walks (12)
 #5 in AL in slugging percentage (.519)
 #7 in AL in bases on balls (85)
 #8 in AL in OPS (.875)

Kirk Gibson
 AL leader in errors by an outfielder (11)
 Finished 18th in AL MVP voting
 #2 in AL in Power/Speed Number (29.5)
 #2 in AL in intentional walks (16)
 #3 in AL in extra base hits (71)
 #4 in AL in sacrifice flies (10)
 #4 in AL in strikeouts (137)
 #6 in AL in slugging percentage (.518)
 #6 in AL in total bases (301)
 #6 in AL in runs created (118)
 #7 in AL in OPS (.882)
 #7 in AL in doubles (37)
 #8 in AL in strikeouts (30)
 #9 in AL in home runs (29)
 #10 in MLB in total bases (301)
 #10 in MLB in doubles (37)
 #10 in MLB in runs created (118)

Willie Hernández
 AL All Star Team, pitcher
 #2 in MLB in games finished (64)
 #3 in AL in saves (31)
 #3 in AL in games (74)

Chet Lemon
 #5 in AL in times hit by pitch (10)

Jack Morris
 AL All Star Team, starting pitcher
 AL leader in wild pitches (15)
 #2 in AL in shutouts (4)
 #2 in AL in bases on balls allowed (110)
 #3 in AL in strikeouts (191)
 #4 in AL in hits allowed per 9 innings pitched (7.42)
 #4 in AL in strikeouts per 9 innings pitched (6.69)
 #5 in AL in complete games (13)
 #10 in MLB in batters faced (1077)

Lance Parrish
 AL Gold Glove Award, catcher
 AL All Star Team, catcher

Dan Petry
 AL All Star Team, pitcher
 #3 in AL in hits allowed per 9 innings (7.16)
 #5 in AL in walks plus hits per inning pitched (WHIP) (1.135)

Frank Tanana
 #3 in AL in strikeout to walk ratio (2.79)
 #5 in AL in strikeouts per 9 innings pitched (6.66)

Walt Terrell
 #4 in AL in shutouts (3)

Alan Trammell
 AL All Star Team, shortstop
 #7 in AL in sacrifice hits (11)
 #8 in AL in outs (480)
 #9 in AL in sacrifice flies (9)

Lou Whitaker
 AL Gold Glove Award, second base
 AL Silver Slugger Award, second base
 AL All Star Team, starting second baseman
 #7 in AL in triples (8)
 #9 in AL in plate appearances (701)
 #9 in AL in runs created (107)
 #9 in AL in times on base (252)
 #10 in AL in runs (102)

Farm system

LEAGUE CHAMPIONS: Bristol

References

External links

 1985 Detroit Tigers Regular Season Statistics

Detroit Tigers seasons
Detroit Tiger
Detroit Tigers
1985 in Detroit